Peep-Hole may refer to:

Peephole, a small opening to look through a door
"Peep-Hole", a song by Guided by Voices from their 1994 album Bee Thousand